Anna Bornemisza (1630-1688), was a Hungarian noble, princess consort of Transylvania as the spouse of Michael I Apafi, and mother of Michael II Apafi. Her cookery book from 1680, as well as her preserved household budget book, are regarded as important documents of Hungarian literary history. As Princess of Transylvania, Anna exerted a large and acknowledged influence upon the affairs of state.

Bornemisza was the daughter of a military captain. She spent her childhood in Jenő and Munkács. She married Michael I Apafi in 1653. When her husband was captured in 1657, Bornemisza collected 12,000 horses as his ransom. She was influential over matters of state when her husband was elected the leader of Transylvania. She had fourteen children but only one son, Michael II Apafi, reached adulthood.

References 

1630 births
1688 deaths
17th-century Hungarian women writers
17th-century Hungarian writers
Hungarian nobility in Transylvania
Hungarian princesses
Apafi family